Wales Island is one of the uninhabited Canadian arctic islands in the Qikiqtaaluk Region of Nunavut.

Named Prince of Wales Island by the Scottish Arctic explorer, Dr. John Rae, it was subsequently shortened to Wales Island.

References

Islands of the Gulf of Boothia
Uninhabited islands of Qikiqtaaluk Region